Unnamed Battery is an historic artillery battery located at West Ashley, Charleston, South Carolina. It was built in 1862, to protect the exterior western lines running from the Stono River on the south to the Ashley River at Bee's Ferry. It has emplacements for two guns. It measures approximately 160 feet by 160 feet with a 10-foot parapet and a 15-foot powder magazine.

It was listed on the National Register of Historic Places in 1982.

References 

Military facilities on the National Register of Historic Places in South Carolina
Military installations established in 1862
Buildings and structures in Charleston County, South Carolina
National Register of Historic Places in Charleston, South Carolina
1862 establishments in South Carolina
Military units and formations established in 1862
American Civil War on the National Register of Historic Places